Agios Nikolaos is a small settlement on the island of Zakynthos, Greece. It is located approximately 32 kilometers northwest of Zakynthos City. It has a population of 42, according to a census conducted in 2001. Administratively, it belongs to the village of Volimes, located around 10 kilometres inland.

Despite small size, Agios Nikolaos houses an important harbor, as it is a starting point of ferry boats to Pesada in Kephalonia. Two ferries a day run in the summer season. Small boats drive tourists to nearby Cape Skinari, the northernmost point of the island, and Blue Caves on the coast between. The caves are shallow orifices in the white cliffs, combined with numerous rock arches. They are named after the turquoise blue colour of the sea. An islet, also named Agios Nikolaos, lies off the coast, protecting the harbor from northerly winds.

References

External links
Greek Travel Pages
Agios Nikolaos Beach - Zakynthos

Populated places in Zakynthos